Ariat International is an American footwear, apparel and accessories brand for equestrian sports, work industries and other outdoor activities, located in Union City, California. Ariat was launched by Beth Cross and Pam Parker in 1993, with the goal of creating high-quality boots that would provide excellent performance, comfort, and durability for riders. It has since become a popular brand in performance footwear for English and Western horseback riding.

Ariat is a well-known brand that specializes in equestrian and western-style boots, as well as other types of apparel and accessories for horse riders and enthusiasts. Since then, Ariat has expanded its product line to include a wide range of apparel and accessories, including riding breeches, jackets, hats, and more. The company's products are designed with advanced technologies such as ATS (Advanced Torque Stability) and Duratread outsoles, which provide superior support, stability, and durability.

History
Ariat was founded in 1993 by Stanford Business School classmates Beth Cross and Pam Parker.  While working for Bain & Company and consulting to Reebok, the co-founders saw an opportunity to apply athletic shoe technology to English and Western riding boots. In 1993, Ariat released its first two boot styles, then went on to hire a number of equestrians and horse enthusiasts. In the years following the company's launch, it expanded into new performance western and English apparel, as well as workwear. The company also expanded its distribution in the U.S., Europe, Australia, Mexico, and Japan.

In 2009, Ariat became the official sponsor of Professional Bull Riders (PBR). Ariat has since been cited by numerous publications as a popular brand in American performance footwear for both English and Western riding.  In 2015, Ariat signed a sponsorship deal with the International Federation for Equestrian Sports (FEI). In 2017, Ariat joined partners with the non-profit Jared Allen's Homes For Wounded Warriors, an organization which builds homes for injured war veterans.

In 2018, Ariat announced that they were continuing their partnership with the US Equestrian Federation (USEF), and Cross was awarded "Entrepreneur of the Year"  in the Consumer Driven category by Ernst & Young. As of 2020, Ariat is reportedly the largest equestrian footwear and apparel company in the world.

Product design
Ariat manufactures boots in the United States, Mexico, Asia and Europe.  
Co-founder Beth Cross worked with biomechanical research groups and testing labs in the making of Ariat's boots, which are designed to be durable in outdoor environments, with patented Duratread outsoles, and patented Advanced Torque Stability technology, (ATS), a multi-layered  lightweight sole with a gel-cushioned footbed and a heel stabilizer to provide more support while riding. In the late 1990s they introduced Hexcel cushioning technology for shock absorption while riding and on the ground, and introduced Cobalt technology in the early 2000s for further cushioning support.

In 2006, the firm ventured into making western apparel, including woven shirts, tops and outdoor clothing for men and women. The clothing incorporates flame-resistant technology, which came into demand from the oil workers of Colorado.  In 2018, Ariat released their waterproof . Their waterproof  use a U-turn entry system to make them easier to put on.

Sponsorship 
Ariat has numerous sponsorship agreements with riders, teams, and global events.  Ariat is the official partner of the United States Equestrian Federation (USEF) and has long-term partnerships with show jumpers Beezie Madden and Meredith Michaels-Beerbaum, hunter riders John French and Hope Glynn, and three-day eventing riders Phillip Dutton and Boyd Martin.

Ariat is the official footwear sponsor of the Professional Bull Riders (PBR), the title sponsor of the Ariat World Series of Team Roping (WSTR), the largest adult community of roping athletes.  Ariat has many elite rodeo athlete endorsements including world champion Trevor Brazile, world champion of bareback bronc riding Kaycee Feild, International Professional Rodeo Association (IPRA) world champion Cord McCoy, and numerous world-ranked professional bull riders, including Ezekiel Mitchell, Cooper Davis, Kaique Pacheco and Jose Vitor Leme, the #1 ranked bull-rider in the world as of August 2020. As of August 2020, Ariat also supports the Compton Junior Equestrians, a non-profit organization that was developed to provide inner-city youth with programs that support staying in school.

Ariat was featured in the 2015 movie The Longest Ride, a Nicholas Sparks film about a PBR athlete who is making his way back in bull riding after a life-threatening injury.  For this movie, Ariat partnered with 20th Century Fox and PBR to make the lead character, (played by actor Scott Eastwood), an Ariat-sponsored bull rider.

Ariat work boots 
Ariat also offers a line of work boots that are designed to provide comfort, protection, and durability for people who work in demanding environments. Ariat work boots are known for their high-quality materials and construction, which make them suitable for a wide range of jobs, including construction, farming, and industrial work.

Ariat work boots feature advanced technologies such as ATS (Advanced Torque Stability) and Duratread outsoles, which provide support, cushioning, and slip-resistance on various surfaces. The boots are also available with safety features such as steel toes, electrical hazard protection, and waterproofing.

In addition to their functional features, Ariat work boots are available in a range of styles and designs, so you can choose a pair that suits your personal preferences and work requirements. Whether you need a sturdy pair of boots for outdoor work or a comfortable and durable pair for indoor jobs, Ariat work boots are a reliable choice.

References 

Shoe brands
Clothing companies established in 1990
Private equity portfolio companies
Companies based in Alameda County, California